is a Japanese politician of the New Komeito Party, a member of the House of Councillors in the Diet (national legislature). A native of Kaisō District, Wakayama and graduate of the University of Tokyo, he was elected to the House of Councillors for the first time in 1995 after running unsuccessfully for the House of Representatives in 1993.

References

External links 
  

Members of the House of Councillors (Japan)
University of Tokyo alumni
Living people
1952 births
New Komeito politicians